Joe Root is an English cricketer and former captain of the England Test team. Described by his compatriots Eoin Morgan and Alastair Cook as the "most complete batsman" England has ever produced, Root has played 129 Tests and 158 One Day Internationals (ODIs), scoring 29 centuries (100 or more runs in an innings) in Tests and 16 in One Day Internationals  .

Root made his Test debut in December 2012 and scored his first century the following year when he made 104 against New Zealand at Headingley. In July 2013, he became the youngest English player to score an Ashes century at Lord's when he made 180 in the second Test of the home series against Australia. His innings earned him the man of the match award and ensured England's victory. Root's performance during the 2013 season led to him being named as one of the five Cricketers of the Year by Wisden Cricketers' Almanack in 2014. He went on to score three more centuries the same year, including a double century (200 not out) against Sri Lanka at Lord's. His highest score of 254 came against Pakistan in July 2016. Root became the first cricketer to score a double century in their 100th Test, scoring 218 against India at the M. A. Chidambaram Stadium, Chennai in February 2021. , Root has scored centuries against seven of the other eleven Test-playing nations; he has been most prolific against India, scoring nine centuries against them.

Root scored his first ODI century in 2014 against the West Indies. His 16 centuries in the format are the most by an English player. His centuriesscored at thirteen different venueshave come against seven different opponents. His highest ODI score of 133 not out was made against Bangladesh in June 2017. Root has played 32 Twenty20 International (T20I) matches since his debut in December 2012. He is yet to score a century in the format; his 90 not out against Australia in August 2013 remains his highest score. , Root ranks joint eleventh among cricketers with most centuries in international cricket.

Key 
 *  Remained not out
   Captain of England in that match
   Man of the match

Test centuries

One Day International centuries

Notes

References

External links 
 

Centuries, Root
Root, Joe